is a professional Japanese baseball player. He plays pitcher for the Tokyo Yakult Swallows.

References 

1995 births
Living people
Baseball people from Sapporo
Japanese baseball players
Nippon Professional Baseball pitchers
Chiba Lotte Marines players
Tokyo Yakult Swallows players